{{Infobox film
| name           = Shadow of a Scream
| image          = 
| caption        = 
| director       = Howard McCain
| producer       = Mary Ann FisherexecutiveLance H RobbinsRoger Cormanco-producerCheryl ParnellEdward G Reilly
| writer         = Christopher Wood
| narrator       =
| starring       = Timothy BusfieldAthena MasseyDavid Chokachi
| music          = 
| cinematography = Edward Talavera
| editing        = 
| studio         =  
| distributor    =  
| released       = 
| runtime        = 
| country        = United StatesIreland
| language       = English
| budget         =
| gross          =
}}Shadow of a Scream, also known as The Unspeakable and Criminal Pursuit''', is a 1996 American-Irish film directed by Howard McCain and starring Timothy Busfield, Athena Massey and David Chokachi. It was part of the Roger Corman Presents'' series on Showtime.

Cast
David Chokachi
Cyril O'Reilly
Athena Massey
Timothy Busfield

References

External links
Shadow of a Scream at TCMDB

Film page at Letterbox DVD

1996 films
Films produced by Roger Corman
American action thriller films
Irish action thriller films
1996 action thriller films
1990s English-language films
1990s American films